The Greece men's national basketball team represents Greece in international basketball. They are controlled by the Hellenic Basketball Federation, the governing body for basketball in Greece. Greece is currently ranked ninth in the FIBA World Rankings.

Greece have appeared eight times at the FIBA World Cup, with their best result coming in 2006 as runners-up, after beating the United States 101–95 in the tournament's semi-final. Greece have taken part in the EuroBasket 28 times, winning the tournament twice; while also coming away with one silver (1989), as well as two bronze medals (1949, 2009). Some of the team's highlights at the competition were beating the Soviet Union 103–101 in the final in Athens to win their first title in 1987, and defeating Germany 78–62 in the final in 2005. Greece have competed four times at the Olympic Games, their best results being fifth place finishes on three occasions (1996, 2004, 2008).

Greece is the only national team in the world to have defeated the United States during Mike Krzyzewski's era (2005–2016), as the latter had an undefeated record both before and after the 2006 FIBA World Cup semi-final, all major competitions included.

History

Basketball has a long tradition in Greece, as the country was one of the eight founding members of the International Basketball Federation, more commonly known by its French acronym FIBA, in 1932. However, the men's national team was considered as a second-class power in international basketball for several decades and came into prominence in the mid-1980s by winning the EuroBasket 1987. It was the first ever major international title won by a Greece national team in any sports. Basketball became extremely popular in the country and since then Greece has been placed in the high level on the basketball stage.

International debut and first successes
Greece was to take part in the EuroBasket 1935, the inaugural FIBA European Championship held in Geneva, but were not able to travel to Switzerland due to financial problems. Thus, Greece made their international debut fourteen years later in the EuroBasket 1949 in Cairo, Egypt. That tournament has been marked as the weakest in the history of the competition, as most of the leading European basketball nations at the time refused to travel by plane to Egypt. Greece entered the tournament as a newcomer and got through to make their first major success in their very first appearance in the competition, finishing in third place behind hosts Egypt and a strong side French team.

After their first international success, the Greeks participated in the next tournament at EuroBasket 1951, where they reached the semi-final round ending up eighth among the eighteen nations that participated. They also made their first appearance at the Summer Olympic Games, taking part in the Summer Olympic basketball tournament in 1952. They were narrowly eliminated in the preliminary phase, finishing at the bottom of the table along with other six teams and also bringing to an end the first period in the history of Greek basketball as they did not enter any major tournaments for the rest of the 1950s.

During the 1960s, the 1970s, and the first half of the 1980s, Greece appeared in most of the EuroBasket tournaments, with their best performances being 8th place in 1965 and 9th place in both 1979 and 1981. They did not qualify for the Summer Olympic Games or to the FIBA World Cup, but they did win two regional gold medals. They won the gold at the 1979 Mediterranean Games by beating Yugoslavia by a score of 85–74 in the final, and the 1979 Balkan Championship, again by beating Yugoslavia, 66–62.

Rise to the top level: European Champions
The history of the national team was fairly pedestrian until the mid-1980s, when Greece arrived as a powerhouse in international basketball, spearheaded by elite players like Nikos Galis, Panagiotis Giannakis, Panagiotis Fasoulas and Fanis Christodoulou. The arrival began with their qualification to the 1986 FIBA World Cup, a first in their history. The national team went on to finish 10th among the twenty-four nations at the tournament, but it was a catalyst for the future.

The following year, Greece faced their biggest challenge, as the country hosted the EuroBasket 1987 with the national team entering the tournament with a formidable line-up. After advancing through the group stages, they eliminated Italy and Yugoslavia, both among the favorites to win the tournament, in the quarter-finals and the semi-finals respectively. In the final, Greece faced the defending champions and heavily favored Soviet Union. In front of 17,000 Greek fans at the Peace and Friendship Stadium, the hosts won the gold medal after a thrilling win 103–101 over the Soviets, with Nikos Galis scoring 40 points. It was the first time that the Greek national team won a major tournament in any sport, instantly making basketball the national sport while the national team became cherished throughout the country.

The European champions failed to qualify for the 1988 Summer Olympic Games for a first time in 36 years, despite a decent performance in the pre-Olympic tournament. At the EuroBasket 1989, the defending champions were under pressure to prove that they could repeat the level of excellence they displayed at their last EuroBasket appearance, and they did so in a convincing way. After they had advanced to the knockout stages, the Soviet Union stood in their way in the semi-finals, but Greece defeated them once again and reached the final. In contrast to 1989, this time Greece had to overcome Yugoslavia and the latters' home court advantage in Zagreb. Greece would take home the silver medal, repeating their feat from the previous tournament to at least finish in a medal position at EuroBasket, making it their third medal in their basketball history.

Firmly among the best in the world but no medals
In the 1990s there was a series of successful results for the national team, which was present in all major international tournaments every year except for the 1992 Summer Olympic Games. In the period between 1990 and 1998, Greece never fell below 6th place and usually ended up 4th. They also qualified for a second Olympic appearance in 1996, where the team finished in 5th place.

At the 1990 FIBA World Cup, the team would face a new challenge as they would have to compete without their leading scorer Nikos Galis who was injured, but performed better than four years ago and eventually placed 6th in the tournament. For the next two competitions in 1994 and 1998 Greece finished 4th. In 1994, the team reached the semi-finals but were eliminated by the United States and played for the third place against Croatia to which they lost and were placed 4th, a result that was considered to demonstrate the continued prominence of the team. In 1998, the tournament was held in Athens and the Greeks hoped to qualify for the final. Although in the semi-final they were eliminated by FR Yugoslavia in extra time, and their disappointment of missing the chance to reach the final led to an easy defeat to the United States in the bronze medal game, once more leaving Greece 4th.

At the EuroBasket 1991 Greece finished 5th and just out of reach at 4th place of the medal position in 1993, 1995 and 1997. Greece acted as host at the 1995 tournament, failing to repeat the triumph of 1987 when defeated in the semi-final by FR Yugoslavia, something that happened again in 1997, while hosts Germany had eliminated Greece in 1993.

The years 1999–2002 were marked by an obvious decline of Greece. The beginning of this era was the shocking 16th and last place of the team in the final standings of the EuroBasket 1999, having suffered three defeats in the preliminary round. Consequently, Greece was absent from the 2000 Summer Olympic Games. At the next European championship in 2001, the Greek team was placed 9th, thus failed to qualify for the 2002 FIBA World Cup.

European Champions and FIBA World Cup Runners-up

The revival of Greece started at the EuroBasket 2003, where an overhauled team finished 5th. The experiment was partly successful, but the public was not very enthusiastic. The 2004 Summer Olympic Games in Athens, were considered as the biggest chance for the hosts Greece to win their first Olympic medal. But in a close 69–64 loss to the eventual gold medalists Argentina in the quarter-finals, stopped any chance of it becoming reality. The team would go on to place 5th in the standings at the event overall.

Greece were considered a strong outsider for the medals at the EuroBasket 2005. They advanced from the group stage with two wins in three games and eliminated Israel and Russia to reach the semi-finals, where they faced France. The French side were leading the score by seven points with only one minute left, Greece appeared to have no chance to pull out the win and one more lost semi-final was coming. However, the Greeks managed to get within a two-point deficit and won 67–66 with a three-pointer by Dimitris Diamantidis with three seconds remaining, setting off a joyous celebration from the Greek side. In the final and in front of a raucous pro-Greece sold-out crowd of 20,000 at the Belgrade Arena, the Greeks defeated Germany in a convincing way 78–62, winning the gold medal for the second time in their history.

The following year, the European champions won the 2006 Stanković Cup going undefeated in the tournament and defeating Germany again in the final with an impressive 84–47 win. At the 2006 FIBA World Cup, Greece were determined to win a medal they had closely missed in their last two appearances in the tournament. They reached the semi-finals with a record of (7-0), with some of their wins coming in grand fashion. In the semi-finals, Greece defeated the popular odds-on United States in a 101–95 upset, rallying back from twelve points down, and qualified for the final. But, they ultimately ran out of gas from their dramatic game with the Americans and lost 70–47 to Spain, ending up with the silver medal. Despite the loss the players were greeted enthusiastically by celebrating fans on their return to Greece, due to their first ever medal in a World Cup and their victory over the United States.

At the EuroBasket 2007, the defending European champions advanced to the semi-finals where they faced the hosts and reigning World champions Spain, in a rematch of the final one year prior. Greece came close to take revenge but eventually lost 82–77, and played in the bronze medal game where they succumbed to Lithuania. At the 2008 Summer Olympic Games, another last-second defeat 80–78 to Argentina in the quarter-finals led Greece to a 5th-place finish once again. At the EuroBasket 2009, the national team was potently changed, with a bunch of young players and without key players Thodoris Papaloukas and Dimitris Diamantidis, as well as Panagiotis Vasilopoulos and Kostas Tsartsaris, the tournament was perceived as the turning point for Greece after their major recent achievements. However, after their fourth consecutive defeat to Spain in the semi-finals and sixty years after their first, and last, bronze medal they managed to take the podium in the third position against the odds, with a thrilling 57–56 win over Slovenia, ceasing the curse of being defeated in all bronze medal matches in their history.

Before the 2010 FIBA World Cup, the team exhibited impressive performances during friendly preparation matches, beating Germany 82–54, Russia 101–63, Croatia 90–81, Canada 123–49, Slovenia 96–72, and Serbia 74–73, in a game that ended up in a brawl. That brawl exposed problems within the team, which showed a different face in crucial matches in the World Cup. In the group stage, Greece lost to Turkey and Russia, (being accused of purposely losing the game with Russia, to avoid playing with Spain in the knock-out stage). France's loss to New Zealand meant that Greece had to face Spain anyway in the round of 16. The two teams met once more, in a dramatic game that Spain won in the last minutes (a game that lead to Greek complaints about critical referee calls). That loss meant that the Greek team was eliminated from the next stage, ending up 11th (its worst performance in a World Cup). That game led to the fifth consecutive Spanish victory over Greece in major international competitions (Greece would stop Spain's winning streak 3 years later at EuroBasket 2013, beating them 79–75, with Vassilis Spanoulis scoring 20 points). That actually represented a reversal of the previous situation, as Greece had previously defeated Spain in every game they played against each other at the four major international competitions (1990 FIBA World Cup, EuroBasket 1993, EuroBasket 1995, and the 1998 FIBA World Cup). After the elimination in the 2010 FIBA World Cup, Dimitris Diamantidis announced his retirement from the national team, at age 30.

2011–present

During preparations for EuroBasket 2011, new head coach, Ilias Zouros, faced one of the greatest challenges in the history of the Greek basketball team, with the absences of no less than 9 key players (including star players: Dimitris Diamantidis, Thodoris Papaloukas, Sofoklis Schortsanitis, and Vassilis Spanoulis). Zouros had to assemble a team mostly made of young players (half of the team's players had never participated in the EuroBasket, with little time to prepare. The new national team, featuring some of the next generation Greek players ("Generation X"), exhibited promising signs during friendlies, beating Russia 83–80, Germany 69–56, and Turkey 62–38. At the EuroBasket, Greece managed to reach the quarterfinals, where they lost to the eventual silver medalist France 64–56. Subsequently, the victory against Serbia 87–77, and the loss to Lithuania 73–69, led Greece to 6th place, thus securing participation in the 2012 FIBA World Olympic Qualifying Tournament. At the 2012 FIBA World Olympic Qualifying Tournament, Greece failed to qualify for the Olympics, after an 80–79 loss to Nigeria.

Participation at the EuroBasket 2013 with its new head coach, Andrea Trinchieri, didn't bring any consolation to its fans. The team once again exhibited superb performance during preparation games (including commanding victories against both eventual finalists France and Lithuania) earning the top spot on the FIBA EuroBasket power rankings before the tournament. Their start in the EuroBasket was equally fruitful, with comfortable victories against Sweden (79–51), Russia (80–71) and Turkey (84–61). However, serious injuries to (Spanoulis, Mavrokefalidis, Papanikolaou, Zisis) plagued the Greek team, despite the impressive win against the defending Champions Spain. Losses in critical games (especially those against Italy and Finland in their preliminary phase group), led to the failure to reach the quarterfinals for the first time since the EuroBasket 2001. They were, however, selected as a wild card for the 2014 FIBA World Cup, being placed in Group B consisting of the Philippines, Senegal, Argentina, Croatia and rivals Puerto Rico.

The national team once again introduced a new head coach in Fotios Katsikaris, and once more had to face what had become a chronic problem of missing key players (this time Vassilis Spanoulis, Kosta Koufos, Antonis Fotsis, Stratos Perperoglou and Sofoklis Schortsanitis). Greece ended up first in its group, after defeating all the above teams (being, along with USA and Spain, one of three undefeated teams in the Group Stage), but lost to Serbia in the Round of 16, and ended up in ninth place overall. Greece participated in EuroBasket 2015, in Group C consisting of Netherlands, Croatia, Slovenia, Georgia and rivals North Macedonia. The national team with Fotios Katsikaris as head coach, ended up first in its group, after defeating all the above nations (being, along with France and Serbia, one of three undefeated teams in the Group Stage). In the Round of 16, they defeated Belgium (75–54), but in the quarterfinals, they lost to Spain (73-71). Two days later (17 September 2015), they defeated Latvia (97–90), ending up in fifth place overall, and qualified to one of the three 2016 FIBA World Olympic Qualifying Tournaments. At the 2016 Turin FIBA World Olympic Qualifying Tournament, Greece defeated Iran (78–53), and Mexico (86–70), but lost to Croatia (66-61), and failed to qualify to the Summer Olympic Games, for the second time in a row. However, they qualified for EuroBasket 2017.

Greece began their EuroBasket 2017 campaign with a victory against Iceland, but lost their next three games against Slovenia, France, and Finland. However, they defeated Poland, by a score of 95–77, to clinch a spot in the knockout rounds. In the round of 16 Greece had a dominant performance in defeating Lithuania, by the score of 77–64, and advanced to the quarterfinals. There, they were eliminated in a hard-fought battle against Russia 74–69.

Honours

Medals table

Individual awards
 FIBA World Cup Top Scorer
 Nikos Galis – 1986
 FIBA World Cup All-Tournament Team
 Thodoris Papaloukas – 2006
 EuroBasket MVP
 Nikos Galis – 1987
 EuroBasket Top Scorer
 Georgios Kolokythas – 1967, 1969
 Nikos Galis – 1983, 1987, 1989, 1991
 Giannis Antetokounmpo – 2022
 EuroBasket All-Tournament Team
 Nikos Galis – 1983, 1987, 1989, 1991
 Panagiotis Fasoulas – 1987
 Fanis Christodoulou – 1993, 1995
 Dimitris Diamantidis – 2005
 Thodoris Papaloukas – 2005
 Vassilis Spanoulis – 2009
 Giannis Antetokounmpo – 2022

Competitive record

FIBA World Cup

Olympic Games

EuroBasket

Results and fixtures

2022

2023

Team

Current roster
Roster for the 2023 FIBA World Cup Qualifiers matches on 11 and 14 November 2022 against Latvia and Belgium.

Depth chart
Based on the recent calls and selections

Historical players

Historical head coaches

Past rosters

1949 EuroBasket: finished 3rd  among 7 teams

3 Takis Taliadoros, 4 Sokratis Apostolidis, 5 Alekos Apostolidis, 6 Stelios Arvanitis, 7 Nikos Skylakakis, 8 Nikos Nomikos, 9 Nikos Milas, 10 Missas Pantazopoulos, 11 Alekos Spanoudakis, 12 Ioannis Lambrou, 21 Faidon Matthaiou, 22 Nikos Bournelos, 30 Thanasis Kostopoulos (Coach: Giorgos Karatzopoulos)  

1951 EuroBasket: finished 8th among 17 teams

3 Faidon Matthaiou, 4 Nikos Milas, 5 Alekos Apostolidis, 6 Ioannis Lambrou, 7 Stelios Arvanitis, 8 Themis Cholevas, 9 Aristeidis Roubanis, 10 Mimis Stefanidis, 11 Panagiotis Manias, 13 Alekos Spanoudakis, 14 Ioannis Spanoudakis, 15 Takis Taliadoros (Coach: Vladimiros Vallas)  

1952 Olympic Games: finished 17th among 23 teams

4 Faidon Matthaiou, 5 Nikos Milas, 6 Ioannis Lambrou, 7 Panagiotis Manias, 8 Aristeidis Roubanis, 9 Ioannis Spanoudakis, 10 Themis Cholevas, 11 Alekos Spanoudakis, 12 Kostas Papadimas, 13 Mimis Stefanidis, 14 Stelios Arvanitis, 15 Takis Taliadoros (Coach: Vladimiros Vallas)

1961 EuroBasket: finished 17th among 19 teams

4 Georgios Amerikanos, 5 Nikitas Aliprantis, 6 Antonis Christeas, 7 Georgios Oikonomou, 8 Alekos Kontovounisios, 9 Giannis Tsikas, 10 Giannis Bousios, 11 Nikos Chalas, 12 Kostas Mourouzis, 13 Stelios Gousios, 14 Dimitris Lekkas, 15 Kostas Politis (Coach: Faidon Matthaiou)

1965 EuroBasket: finished 8th among 16 teams

4 Kostas Politis, 5 Georgios Barlas, 6 Dimitris Lekkas, 7 Georgios Kolokythas, 8 Eas Larentzakis, 9 Takis Maglos, 10 Georgios Amerikanos, 11 Alekos Kontovounisios, 12 Petros Panagiotarakos, 13 Nikos Sismanidis, 14 Georgios Trontzos, 15 Andreas Chaikalis (Coach: Faidon Matthaiou) 

1967 EuroBasket: finished 12th among 16 teams

4 Lakis Tsavas, 5 Georgios Barlas, 6 Kostas Politis, 7 Georgios Kolokythas, 8 Christos Zoupas, 9 Takis Maglos, 10 Vassilis Goumas, 11 Stratos Bazios, 12 Eas Larentzakis, 13 Kostas Diamantopoulos, 14 Georgios Trontzos, 15 Andreas Chaikalis (Coach: Missas Pantazopoulos)

1969 EuroBasket: finished 10th among 12 teams

4 Apostolos Spanos, 5 Georgios Barlas, 6 Georgios Trontzos, 7 Georgios Kolokythas, 8 Christos Zoupas, 9 Vassilis Goumas, 10 Kostas Diamantopoulos, 11 Andreas Chaikalis, 12 Nikos Sismanidis, 13 Thanasis Christoforou, 14 Makis Katsafados, 15 Thanasis Peppas (Coach: Faidon Matthaiou)

1973 EuroBasket: finished 11th among 12 teams

4 Apostolos Kontos, 5 Steve Giatzoglou, 6 Georgios Trontzos, 7 Michalis Giannouzakos, 8 Aris Raftopoulos, 9 Pavlos Stamelos, 10 Christos Kefalos, 11 Vassilis Goumas, 12 Nikos Sismanidis, 13 Georgios Kastrinakis, 14 Christos Iordanidis, 15 Charis Papageorgiou (Coach: Kostas Mourouzis)

1975 EuroBasket: finished 12th among 12 teams

4 Apostolos Kontos, 5 Vassilis Goumas, 6 Dimitris Kokolakis, 7 Michalis Giannouzakos, 8 Aris Raftopoulos, 9 Sotiris Sakellariou, 10 Takis Koroneos, 11 Steve Giatzoglou, 12 Charis Papageorgiou, 13 Georgios Kastrinakis, 14 Pavlos Diakoulas, 15 Dimitris Fosses (Coach: Vangelis Nikitopoulos) 

1979 EuroBasket: finished 9th among 12 teams

4 Minas Gekos, 5 Vassilis Paramanidis, 6 Panagiotis Giannakis, 7 Michalis Giannouzakos, 8 Manthos Katsoulis, 9 Sotiris Sakellariou, 10 Takis Koroneos, 11 Steve Giatzoglou, 12 Charis Papageorgiou, 13 Georgios Kastrinakis, 14 Takis Karatzoulidis, 15 Dimitris Kokolakis (Coach: Richard Dukeshire)  

1981 EuroBasket: finished 9th among 12 teams

4 Nikos Galis, 5 Liveris Andritsos, 6 Panagiotis Giannakis, 7 Kostas Petropoulos, 8 Manthos Katsoulis, 9 Kyriakos Vidas, 10 Takis Koroneos, 11 Asteris Zois, 12 Charis Papageorgiou, 13 Georgios Kastrinakis, 14 Takis Karatzoulidis, 15 Dimitris Kokolakis (Coach: Giannis Ioannidis)

1983 EuroBasket: finished 11th among 12 teams

4 Giannis Paragyios, 5 Albert Mallach, 6 Panagiotis Giannakis, 7 Nikos Galis, 8 Manthos Katsoulis, 9 Minas Gekos, 10 Michalis Romanidis, 11 Nikos Stavropoulos, 12 Liveris Andritsos, 13 Panagiotis Fasoulas, 14 Vangelis Alexandris, 15 Dimitris Kokolakis (Coach: Kostas Politis)

1986 FIBA World Cup: finished 10th among 24 teams

4 Nikos Galis, 5 Nikos Stavropoulos, 6 Panagiotis Giannakis (C), 7 Argiris Kambouris, 8 Argiris Pedoulakis, 9 Panagiotis Karatzas, 10 Michalis Romanidis, 11 Nikos Filippou, 12 Liveris Andritsos, 13 Fanis Christodoulou, 14 Dimitris Dimakopoulos, 15 Christos Christodoulou (Coach: Kostas Politis)

1987 EuroBasket: finished 1st  among 12 teams

4 Nikos Galis (MVP), 5 Nikos Stavropoulos, 6 Panagiotis Giannakis (C), 7 Argiris Kambouris, 8 Nikos Linardos, 9 Panagiotis Karatzas, 10 Michalis Romanidis, 11 Nikos Filippou, 12 Liveris Andritsos, 13 Panagiotis Fasoulas, 14 Memos Ioannou, 15 Fanis Christodoulou (Coach: Kostas Politis)

1989 EuroBasket: finished 2nd  among 8 teams

4 Nikos Galis, 5 Kostas Patavoukas, 6 Panagiotis Giannakis (C), 7 Argiris Kambouris, 8 David Stergakos, 9 Dinos Angelidis, 10 John Korfas, 11 Nikos Filippou, 12 Liveris Andritsos, 13 Panagiotis Fasoulas, 14 Dimitris Papadopoulos, 15 Fanis Christodoulou (Coach: Efthimis Kioumourtzoglou)

1990 FIBA World Cup: finished 6th among 16 teams

4 Georgios Gasparis, 5 Kostas Patavoukas, 6 Panagiotis Giannakis (C), 7 Argiris Kambouris, 8 David Stergakos, 9 Dimitris Papadopoulos, 10 Nasos Galakteros, 11 Vassilis Lipiridis, 12 Liveris Andritsos, 13 Panagiotis Fasoulas, 14 Memos Ioannou, 15 Fanis Christodoulou (Coach: Efthimis Kioumourtzoglou)

1991 EuroBasket: finished 5th among 8 teams

4 Nikos Galis, 5 Kostas Patavoukas, 6 Panagiotis Giannakis (C), 7 Argiris Kambouris, 8 Dinos Angelidis, 9 Ioannis Milonas, 10 Giorgos Gasparis, 11 Vassilis Lipiridis, 12 Liveris Andritsos, 13 Panagiotis Fasoulas, 14 Georgios Papadakos, 15 Dimitris Papadopoulos (Coach: Efthimis Kioumourtzoglou)

1993 EuroBasket: finished 4th among 16 teams

4 Georgios Bosganas, 5 Kostas Patavoukas, 6 Panagiotis Giannakis (C), 7 Lefteris Kakiousis, 8 Georgios Sigalas, 9 Efthimis Bakatsias, 10 Nasos Galakteros, 11 Christos Tsekos, 12 Giannis Papagiannis, 13 Panagiotis Fasoulas, 14 Nikos Oikonomou, 15 Fanis Christodoulou (Coach: Efthimis Kioumourtzoglou)

1994 FIBA World Cup: finished 4th among 16 teams

4 Panagiotis Giannakis (C), 5 Georgios Sigalas, 6 Nasos Galakteros, 7 Argiris Papapetrou, 8 Panagiotis Fasoulas, 9 Christos Tsekos, 10 Ioannis Milonas, 11 Efthimios Rentzias, 12 Efthimis Bakatsias, 13 Nikos Boudouris, 14 Fanis Christodoulou, 15 Kostas Patavoukas (Coach: Makis Dendrinos)

1995 EuroBasket: finished 4th among 14 teams

4 Efthimis Bakatsias, 5 Kostas Patavoukas, 6 Panagiotis Giannakis (C), 7 Tzanis Stavrakopoulos, 8 Georgios Sigalas, 9 Lefteris Kakiousis, 10 Fragiskos Alvertis, 11 Nikos Oikonomou, 12 Dinos Angelidis, 13 Panagiotis Fasoulas, 14 Efthimios Rentzias, 15 Fanis Christodoulou (Coach: Makis Dendrinos)

1996 Olympic Games: finished 5th among 12 teams

4 Efthimis Bakatsias, 5 Kostas Patavoukas, 6 Panagiotis Giannakis (C), 7 Dimitris Papanikolaou, 8 Georgios Sigalas, 9 Lefteris Kakiousis, 10 Fragiskos Alvertis, 11 Nikos Oikonomou, 12 Dinos Angelidis, 13 Panagiotis Fasoulas, 14 Efthimios Rentzias, 15 Fanis Christodoulou (Coach: Makis Dendrinos)

1997 EuroBasket: finished 4th among 16 teams

4 Georgios Kalaitzis, 5 Kostas Patavoukas, 6 Nikos Boudouris, 7 Dimitris Papanikolaou, 8 Georgios Sigalas, 9 Angelos Koronios, 10 Fragiskos Alvertis, 11 Nikos Oikonomou, 12 Christos Myriounis, 13 Ioannis Giannoulis, 14 Efthimios Rentzias, 15 Fanis Christodoulou (Coach: Panagiotis Giannakis)

1998 FIBA World Cup: finished 4th among 16 teams

4 Georgios Kalaitzis, 5 Georgios Balogiannis, 6 Nikos Boudouris, 7 Dimitris Papanikolaou, 8 Georgios Sigalas (C), 9 Angelos Koronios, 10 Fragiskos Alvertis, 11 Nikos Oikonomou, 12 Jake Tsakalidis, 13 Panagiotis Fasoulas, 14 Efthimios Rentzias, 15 Georgios Karagkoutis (Coach: Panagiotis Giannakis)

1999 EuroBasket: finished 16th among 16 teams

4 Georgios Kalaitzis, 5 Georgios Balogiannis, 6 Nikos Boudouris, 7 Dimitris Papanikolaou, 8 Georgios Sigalas (C), 9 Angelos Koronios, 10 Fragiskos Alvertis, 11 Vassilis Soulis, 12 Jake Tsakalidis, 13 Ioannis Giannoulis, 14 Michalis Kakiouzis, 15 Georgios Karagkoutis (Coach: Kostas Petropoulos)

2001 EuroBasket: finished 11th among 16 teams

4 Georgios Kalaitzis, 5 Nikos Chatzivrettas, 6 Thodoris Papaloukas, 7 Dimitris Papanikolaou, 8 Georgios Sigalas (C), 9 Antonis Fotsis, 10 Fragiskos Alvertis, 11 Dimos Dikoudis, 12 Michalis Kakiouzis, 13 Lazaros Papadopoulos, 14 Efthimios Rentzias, 15 Ioannis Giannoulis (Coach: Kostas Petropoulos)

2003 EuroBasket: finished 5th among 16 teams

4 Dimitris Diamantidis, 5 Nikos Chatzivrettas, 6 Thodoris Papaloukas, 7 Dimitris Papanikolaou, 8 Georgios Sigalas, 9 Antonis Fotsis, 10 Fragiskos Alvertis (C), 11 Dimos Dikoudis, 12 Jake Tsakalidis, 13 Christos Charissis, 14 Efthimios Rentzias, 15 Michalis Kakiouzis (Coach: Giannis Ioannidis)

2004 Olympic Games: finished 5th among 12 teams

4 Fragiskos Alvertis (C), 5 Thodoris Papaloukas, 6 Nikos Zisis, 7 Dimitris Papanikolaou, 8 Vassilis Spanoulis, 9 Antonis Fotsis, 10 Nikos Chatzivrettas, 11 Dimos Dikoudis, 12 Kostas Tsartsaris, 13 Dimitris Diamantidis, 14 Lazaros Papadopoulos, 15 Michalis Kakiouzis (Coach: Panagiotis Giannakis)

2005 EuroBasket: finished 1st  among 16 teams

4 Thodoris Papaloukas, 5 Vassilis Spanoulis, 6 Nikos Zisis, 7 Ioannis Bourousis, 8 Panagiotis Vasilopoulos, 9 Antonis Fotsis, 10 Nikos Chatzivrettas, 11 Dimos Dikoudis, 12 Kostas Tsartsaris, 13 Dimitris Diamantidis, 14 Lazaros Papadopoulos, 15 Michalis Kakiouzis (C) (Coach: Panagiotis Giannakis) 

2006 FIBA World Cup: finished 2nd  among 24 teams

4 Thodoris Papaloukas, 5 Sofoklis Schortsanitis, 6 Nikos Zisis, 7 Vassilis Spanoulis, 8 Panagiotis Vasilopoulos, 9 Antonis Fotsis, 10 Nikos Chatzivrettas, 11 Dimos Dikoudis, 12 Kostas Tsartsaris, 13 Dimitris Diamantidis, 14 Lazaros Papadopoulos, 15 Michalis Kakiouzis (C) (Coach: Panagiotis Giannakis) 

2007 EuroBasket: finished 4th among 16 teams

4 Thodoris Papaloukas (C), 5 Ioannis Bourousis, 6 Nikos Zisis, 7 Vassilis Spanoulis, 8 Panagiotis Vasilopoulos, 9 Michalis Pelekanos, 10 Nikos Chatzivrettas, 11 Dimos Dikoudis, 12 Kostas Tsartsaris, 13 Dimitris Diamantidis, 14 Lazaros Papadopoulos, 15 Michalis Kakiouzis (Coach: Panagiotis Giannakis) 

2008 Olympic Games: finished 5th among 12 teams

4 Thodoris Papaloukas (C), 5 Ioannis Bourousis, 6 Nikos Zisis, 7 Vassilis Spanoulis, 8 Panagiotis Vasilopoulos, 9 Antonis Fotsis, 10 Georgios Printezis, 11 Andreas Glyniadakis, 12 Kostas Tsartsaris, 13 Dimitris Diamantidis, 14 Sofoklis Schortsanitis, 15 Michalis Pelekanos (Coach: Panagiotis Giannakis) 

2009 EuroBasket: finished 3rd  among 16 teams

4 Giannis Kalambokis, 5 Ioannis Bourousis, 6 Nikos Zisis, 7 Vassilis Spanoulis, 8 Nick Calathes, 9 Antonis Fotsis (C), 10 Georgios Printezis, 11 Andreas Glyniadakis, 12 Kostas Kaimakoglou, 13 Kosta Koufos, 14 Stratos Perperoglou, 15 Sofoklis Schortsanitis (Coach: Jonas Kazlauskas) 

2010 FIBA World Cup: finished 11th among 24 teams

4 Ian Vougioukas, 5 Ioannis Bourousis, 6 Nikos Zisis, 7 Vassilis Spanoulis, 8 Nick Calathes, 9 Antonis Fotsis (C), 10 Georgios Printezis, 11 Stratos Perperoglou, 12 Kostas Tsartsaris, 13 Dimitris Diamantidis, 14 Kostas Kaimakoglou, 15 Sofoklis Schortsanitis (Coach: Jonas Kazlauskas) 

2011 EuroBasket: finished 6th among 24 teams

4 Vassilis Xanthopoulos, 5 Ioannis Bourousis, 6 Nikos Zisis, 7 Kostas Vasileiadis, 8 Nick Calathes, 9 Antonis Fotsis (C), 10 Kostas Papanikolaou, 11 Dimitrios Mavroeidis, 12 Michael Bramos, 13 Kosta Koufos, 14 Kostas Sloukas, 15 Kostas Kaimakoglou (Coach: Ilias Zouros) 

2013 EuroBasket: finished 11th among 24 teams

4 Kostas Sloukas, 5 Ioannis Bourousis, 6 Nikos Zisis, 7 Vassilis Spanoulis, 8 Stratos Perperoglou, 9 Antonis Fotsis (C), 10 Kostas Papanikolaou, 11 Vassilis Kavvadas, 12 Loukas Mavrokefalidis, 13 Kostas Kaimakoglou, 14 Michael Bramos, 15 Georgios Printezis (Coach: Andrea Trinchieri) 

2014 FIBA World Cup: finished 9th among 24 teams

4 Vangelis Mantzaris, 5 Ioannis Bourousis, 6 Nikos Zisis (C), 7 Kostas Vasileiadis, 8 Nick Calathes, 9 Andreas Glyniadakis, 10 Kostas Papanikolaou, 11 Kostas Sloukas, 12 Kostas Kaimakoglou, 13 Giannis Antetokounmpo, 14 Ian Vougioukas, 15 Georgios Printezis (Coach: Fotios Katsikaris)   

2015 EuroBasket: finished 5th among 24 teams

5 Ioannis Bourousis, 6 Nikos Zisis (C), 7 Vassilis Spanoulis, 8 Nick Calathes, 9 Stratos Perperoglou, 10 Kostas Sloukas, 12 Kostas Kaimakoglou, 13 Kosta Koufos, 15 Georgios Printezis, 16 Kostas Papanikolaou, 17 Vangelis Mantzaris, 34 Giannis Antetokounmpo (Coach: Fotios Katsikaris)  

2017 EuroBasket: finished 8th among 24 teams

8 Nick Calathes, 9 Ioannis Bourousis (C), 10 Kostas Sloukas, 11 Nikos Pappas, 14 Georgios Papagiannis, 15 Georgios Printezis, 16 Kostas Papanikolaou, 17 Vangelis Mantzaris, 18 Dimitrios Agravanis, 19 Ioannis Papapetrou, 31 Georgios Bogris, 43 Thanasis Antetokounmpo (Coach: Kostas Missas)

2019 FIBA World Cup: finished 11th among 32 teams

5 Giannoulis Larentzakis, 8 Nick Calathes, 9 Ioannis Bourousis (C), 10 Kostas Sloukas, 14 Georgios Papagiannis, 15 Georgios Printezis, 16 Kostas Papanikolaou, 17 Vangelis Mantzaris, 19 Ioannis Papapetrou, 21 Panagiotis Vasilopoulos, 34 Giannis Antetokounmpo, 43 Thanasis Antetokounmpo (Coach: Thanasis Skourtopoulos)

2022 EuroBasket: finished 5th among 24 teams

2 Tyler Dorsey, 4 Michalis Lountzis, 5 Giannoulis Larentzakis, 7 Dimitrios Agravanis, 8 Nick Calathes, 10 Kostas Sloukas, 14 Georgios Papagiannis, 16 Kostas Papanikolaou (C), 19 Ioannis Papapetrou, 34 Giannis Antetokounmpo, 37 Kostas Antetokounmpo, 43 Thanasis Antetokounmpo (Coach: Dimitrios Itoudis)

Senior men's statistics

Senior men's players with 100+ career caps
Note: Includes only games played that are classified as being games played under the category of Greek senior men's national basketball team games, as deemed by the Hellenic Basketball Federation.
Players in bold, are players that are still active.

Players with the most caps (games played):

Last updated: 25 January 2023.

Senior men's 1,000+ points career scorers
Note: Includes only games played that are classified as being games played under the category of Greek senior men's national basketball team games, as deemed by the Hellenic Basketball Federation.
Players in bold, are players that are still active.

Last updated: 25 January 2023.

Men's statistics

Men's 1,000 points career scorers
Note: Includes all games played in age 18 and over competitions.
Players in bold, are players that are still active.

Last updated: 25 January 2023.

Team captains

Memorable wins

Kit Suppliers

See also

Sport in Greece
 Greece men's national under-26 basketball team
 Greece men's national under-20 basketball team
 Greece men's national under-19 basketball team
 Greece men's national under-18 basketball team
 Greece men's national under-17 basketball team
 Greece men's national under-16 basketball team

References

External links

 
Greece FIBA profile 
Greece National Team – Men at Eurobasket.com
Greece Basketball Records at FIBA Archive

 
 
Men's national basketball teams
FIBA EuroBasket-winning countries